Selkup language is the language of the Selkups, belonging to the Samoyedic group of the Uralic language family. It is spoken by some 1,570 people (1994 est.) in the region between the Ob and Yenisei Rivers (in Siberia). The language name Selkup comes from the Russian "", based on the native name used in the Taz dialect, шӧльӄумыт әты šöľqumyt әty, lit. forest-man language. Different dialects use different names.

Selkup is fractured in an extensive dialect continuum whose ends are no longer mutually intelligible. The three main varieties are the Taz (Northern) dialect (tazovsky dialekt), which became the basis of the Selkup written language in the 1930s, Tym (Central) dialect (tymsky dialekt), and Ket dialect (ketsky dialekt). It is not related to the Ket language.

Phonology

There are 25 vowel and 16 consonant phonemes in the Taz dialect.

 Voicing is not phonemic. Stops and fricatives may be voiced between vowels or after sonorant consonants.
 The palatalized stop and fricative ,  are most typically rendered as an alveolo-palatal affricate  and fricative . Depending on the speaker, the former can be also realized as the stop , the latter as a non-palatalized fricative, postalveolar  or retroflex .
 Before front vowels, palatalized variants of other consonants are also found.

 Vowel length is phonemic.  alone, deriving from proto-Selkup , has no short counterpart.
 The tenseness contrast, an innovation of northern Selkup, is independent of length (e.g.  all contrast).
 The full range of vowel quality contrasts is only possible in the initial syllable of a word: in later syllables,  of either length do not occur, nor does long . (Shown on a darker gray background.)
 The non-phonemic lax central vowel  only occurs in unstressed non-first syllables; it is normally treated equivalent with short tense .

Selkup has a syllable structure (C)V(C). Word-initial  and word-final  or  do not occur. Various consonant clusters and geminate consonants such as  may occur, though many potential combinations occurring morphologically are simplified.

Stress in Selkup is marginally phonemic. Generally the rightmost long vowel in a word is stressed, or otherwise the first syllable, but certain suffixes with short vowels may acquire stress, leading to minimal pairs such as  "to stamp down" vs.  "to stamp once".

References

Works cited

External links

Endangered Languages of Indigenous Peoples of Siberia: The Selkup Language
The Red Book of the Peoples of the Russian Empire: The Selkups
Audio of a man telling a story in Selkup

Languages of Russia
Southern Samoyedic languages
Yamalo-Nenets Autonomous Okrug
Selkup people